The Lahori Gate or Lohari Gate is located within Walled City of Lahore in Lahore, Pakistan. Lahori Gate is one of the 13 gates of the Walled City of Lahore. 

Being one of the oldest gates of the old city, Lahori Gate is also known as Lohari gate. According to some historians, the original (old) city of Lahore was originally located near Ichhra, and this gate opened towards that side. Hence the name, Lahori gate. The name also traces back its roots to the language of Urdu, in which, “Lohar” means Blacksmith. This could also be another reason behind naming it this way. However, there are no concrete evidences available that blacksmiths used to live or work here.

Lahori Market 
The bazar inside Lohari gate is known as Lohari Mandi (Lohari Market) which is one of the oldest markets of South Asia. In the distant past, caravans and travelers coming from Multan used to enter the city from this gate. According to historians, behind Lohari Gate once stood a brick fort called Kacha Kot which was probably the first fortified city of Lahore founded by Malik Ayaz.

During the Mughal rule, the two famous divisions of the Walled City, namely Guzar Bahar Khan and Guzar Machhi Hatta, were connected by this Gate. Unfortunately, during the anarchic rule of the 18th century, all the city gates, except Lohari Gate along with two other gates were walled up. The current building of Lohari gate was rebuilt in 1864 by Sir Robert Montgomery, the then Governor of Punjab.

See also 

 Lahore
 Lahore Fort
 Walled City of Lahore
 Badshahi Mosque

References

External links 
 Walled City Has thirteen gates

Gates of Lahore
Ravi Zone